iKon, stylized as iKON, is a South Korean boy band under 143 Entertainment. Originally formed in 2015 by YG Entertainment, consisting of six members: Jay, Song, Bobby, DK, Ju-ne and Chan. Originally a seven-piece band, leader B.I departed from the group in June 2019.

Initially introduced in the reality survival show WIN: Who is Next as "Team B", the group went on to appear in the 2014 reality survival show Mix & Match, which determined the final member lineup of iKon. Their debut studio album Welcome Back (2015) debuted atop the South Korean Gaon Album Chart and featured the number-one singles "My Type", "Apology" and "Dumb & Dumber", as well as the top-ten singles "Rhythm Ta", "Airplane" and "Anthem". The album was a commercial success, selling over 260,000 copies in Asia and its individual songs selling over 4.8 million copies, leading the group to receive numerous accolades from major Asian music award shows.

From 2016 to 2017, the group released the singles "#WYD" and "New Kids: Begin", and embarked on their first Asian tour and several Japanese tours. In 2018, their second studio album Return spawned the hit single "Love Scenario", which topped the Gaon Digital Chart for a record-breaking six weeks. Their third EP, I Decide was released on February 6, 2020. Their fourth EP, Flashback, was released on May 3, 2022 which holds a record of their highest 1 day and 1 week sales.

The group departed from YG Entertainment in December 2022, following the expiration of their contract with the agency, and moved to 143 Entertainment. The group is set to release a new album in April 2023.

Career

2013–2014: Pre-debut and formation
Prior to the group's formation, group leader B.I featured on MC Mong's 2009 song "Indian Boy". He performed with MC Mong at the 2009 SBS Dream Concert, as well as on You Hee-yeol's Sketchbook. Group vocalist Ju-ne, under his initial stage name "Junhoe", also made a pre-debut appearance aged thirteen on the SBS variety show Star King. He also competed on SBS's K-pop Star in 2011. On January 3, 2011, B.I and Jay (under his real name, Jinhwan) joined YG Entertainment as trainees, as did Bobby a week later. The three trained together for a year and formed the basis of what was to become "Team B". On April 18, 2012, Junhoe and Song (under his real name, Yunhyeong) joined Team B, followed by DK (under his real name, Donghyuk) as the sixth and final member on November 5, 2012.

In 2013, B.I, Bobby, Jinhwan, Junhoe, Donghyuk and Yunhyeong competed as Team B on the Mnet reality survival show WIN: Who Is Next, competing against other trainees in "Team A" for the chance to debut as a group. The program involved three rounds of performances and public voting, with Team B eventually losing to Team A, who went on to debut as Winner. During the program, Team B released two singles: "Just Another Boy" and "Climax". The members of Team B subsequently appeared as backup dancers in Taeyang's music video for "Ringa Linga".

In June 2014, Team B appeared in the reality survival program Mix & Match, a follow-up to WIN: Who Is Next. The aim of the show was to determine the final lineup of iKon; according to YG Entertainment CEO Yang Hyun-suk, the group's name was derived from the goal to become an 'icon for Korea', hence the 'K'. While Bobby, B.I, and Jinhwan were pre-confirmed members, the remaining members of Team B competed against three new trainees; Jung Jin-hyeong, Yang Hong-seok, and Jung Chan-woo, who had previously appeared on Korean television as a child actor. It was reported that 150,000 fans applied to attend the final performance of the show, and before the announcement of iKon's official lineup, YG Entertainment's blog server crashed. Ultimately, Junhoe, Donghyuk and Yunhyeong successfully retained their places in the line-up, with Chan-woo added as the group’s final member.

Following the program’s success, the iKon members held fan meetings in Korea, Japan, and China. In September, approximately 40,000 Japanese fans applied for 2,000 tickets at a fan meeting at Osaka Tojima River Forum, while more than 50,000 Chinese fans applied for their fan meeting in Beijing. The program was aired on December 29, 2014 on the CS channel in Japan. On December 15, 2014, iKon performed as the opening act at Bigbang's Japan Dome Tour 2014-2015 X. On January 28, 2015, Billboard listed the group as one of the "Top 5 K-Pop Artists to Watch in 2015"; they were the only group on the list that had yet to debut.

2015: Debut and Welcome Back
Following several postponements, iKon's official debut was announced on YG Entertainment's website for September 15, 2015. It was revealed that the group would be releasing their debut album Welcome Back in two parts, with 6 of the 12 tracks being title tracks. The first half of the album, Debut Half Album, was set to be released on October 1, followed by the Debut Full Album on November 2. The track listing for the first half-album was released on September 24. Group leader B.I was credited as the producer and co-composer for all of the album's tracks, with B.I and Bobby contributing to lyrics for all tracks and vocalist Ju-ne participating in the composition of title track "Rhythm Ta".

iKon debuted with the 'pre-single' "My Type" was released with a music video on September 15, 2015. Within 24 hours of its release, the music video for "My Type" surpassed 1.7 million views on YouTube. The group took their first music show win with the single on September 26, 2015 on MBC's Music Core, even though they had yet to make their first official live appearance. On September 24, "My Type" achieved a 'triple crown' on the Gaon chart, having taken the number one spot on the digital, download, and streaming charts simultaneously for the 39th week of 2015. On September 18, the single became number one on the music video chart of Chinese music streaming sites QQ Music and Youku. iKon also trended on Weibo, where they were reportedly searched 1.3 billion times.

iKon's Debut Half Album was released digitally on October 1. The group held their first concert, Showtime, on October 3 at the Seoul Olympic Gymnastics Arena. The show sold out 13,000 tickets. The concert's taking place at the largest concert hall in Korea was unprecedented for a new K-pop group. SHOWTIME was broadcast live through Naver's V App and streamed by over 500,000 viewers.

On October 4, a day after their debut concert, the group made their music show debut on SBS's Inkigayo with "Rhythm Ta" and "Airplane", receiving their third music show win for "My Type" in person. On October 8, they won on Mnet's M!Countdown with "Rhythm Ta". According to the Gaon Music Charts, iKon topped the weekly album sales charts with the first half of Welcome Back for October 4–10.

During October, iKon embarked on a series of Japanese fan meetings titled "iKontact" in Tokyo, Aichi, Fukuoka and Osaka, attended by 26,600 fans. At the end of that month, iKon received a MelOn All-Kill Popularity award and had sold 82,208 copies of Debut Half Album - Welcome Back. On October 28, it was announced that the full album's release would be delayed to December 14, with two additional digital singles released on November 16.

Two digital singles, "Apology" and "Anthem", were released on November 16. "Apology" took the number one spot on Gaon's digital chart for the 48th week of 2015. On December 24, three new singles, "Dumb & Dumber", "What's Wrong?" and "I Miss You So Bad" were released.

2016: Japanese debut, Asian arena tours and new music

On January 13, 2016, the group made their Japanese debut with Japanese version of their album Welcome Back, the album sold 61,508 copies in its first week of release, and charted third on the Oricon Weekly chart, earning them New Artist Award and Best New Artist Award in 58th Japan Record Award. With the Korean edition the album sold over 100,000 copies in Japan in the end of 2016.

On March 17, 2016, YG Entertainment announced that iKon would be holding their first Asia Tour iKoncert 2016: Showtime Tour with dates in Taiwan, China, Hong Kong, Thailand, Singapore, Malaysia and Indonesia. On July 1, their agency announced the band's second Japanese arena tour entitled iKon Japan Tour 2016. The tour was set to visit five cities for a total of 14 concerts with an attendance of 150,000 fans. Later, the company announced the addition of two shows to be held in Tokyo due to more demands in tickets thus, raising the attendance to 176,000 people from six cities. The completion of the second tour pegs the band's total concert attendance during its debut year at 322,000. In November 14, YGEX announced a second leg of iKon Japan Tour in 2017 due to the success of the arena tour, and to visit Yokohama Arena for the first time. The second leg gathered 120,000 fans from three cities, to rise the attendance of the tour to 296,000 from 25 shows.

On May 30, the group released the digital single "#WYD" (short for "What You Doing"). The song debuted at number three on the Gaon Digital Chart. On August 10, the release of iKon's first original Japanese single Dumb & Dumber was announced. The single was released on September 28 with a CD+DVD version and a CD version. It debuted at number one on both the Oricon Daily Single Album Chart and the Oricon Weekly Single Album Chart.

The group participated on Chinese dance survival program Heroes of Remix in mid 2016, alongside Psy as their mentor. They were the most winning artist in the show, winning three weeks, and gaining a good reviews for their performances. But due to the Terminal High Altitude Area Defense (THAAD) issue, the group was entirely edited out from the last episodes of the show. Their activities in the show and touring in China lead them to win Asian Most Popular Korean Group in China Music Awards, Best Group in Netease Attitude Awards, and Best New Force Group and Album of the Year in QQ Music Awards.

2017: Japan Dome tour and New Kids series
On February 11, 2017, it was announced that iKon would start their first dome tour, with two shows set to take place in Kyocera Dome and Seibu Prince Dome, with 90,000 fans expected to come. This made them the fastest group to hold a concert in a Japan dome since debut. On June 18, an additional 22 concerts in eight Japanese cities were announced by YGEX, with 233,000 fans expected to attend, making it the longest and the largest arena tour held by the band in Japan.

On March 2, 2017, YG Entertainment confirmed that iKon had begun shooting two music videos for their new album, that was set to be released in April. during the shooting of the music video, Chanwoo injured his ankle, and consequently the music video shoot was delayed. It was confirmed that they would release a new album series under the name New Kids, which would be released continuously throughout 2017. The series started on May 22, with the single album titled New Kids: Begin.

2018–2019: Completed New Kids series and B.I's departure
iKon released their second studio album and the second of the group's four-part album series, titled Return on January 25, 2018. The lead single, "Love Scenario", is described as a mellow, yet relatively upbeat reaction to breaking up, with a circuitous melody that guides the rhythmic dance track. Their second studio album features 12 tracks that were all co-written or feature lyrics by members B.I and Bobby. Other artists including Psy, BigBang's Taeyang, and Epik High's Tablo also had a role in songwriting tracks alongside YG Entertainment producers, including Choice37 and Teddy Park. "Love Scenario" topped the Gaon Weekly chart for six weeks, making iKon the first artist to achieve this milestone. It also topped the Gaon digital chart for the year of 2018. The group was named the top artist of the first half of 2018 by Genie Music, as they topped the daily music chart for 35 days.

iKon will hold an Asia tour and will visit eight cities. It marks the group second Asia tour after their 2016 iKoncert 2016: Showtime Tour, during the time they did two years intensive touring mostly in Japan as they gathered around 800,000 fans. The tour will visit Australia for the first time, with two shows in Sydney and Melbourne. iKon completed their four-part New Kids album series with the release of their first and second extended play, New Kids: Continue and New Kids: The Final in August and October 2018, respectively.

On June 12, 2019, B.I announced his departure from the group on his personal Instagram account after news agency Dispatch unearthed KakaoTalk messages from three years prior, outlining his attempt to purchase marijuana and LSD from an undisclosed female dealer. He was also accused of evading police charges. As a result, his contract with YG Entertainment was terminated.

2020–2021: I Decide and Kingdom: Legendary War
iKon released their third EP, I Decide, on February 6, 2020, including the title track "Dive", and debuted at number 3 on the Gaon Album Chart. This was the first release of the band since the departure of leader B.I in 2019.

On March 3, 2021, iKon returned with a new digital single "Why Why Why". Soon after, starting in April 2021, iKon competed in Kingdom: Legendary War, alongside five other K-pop boy groups. In the show's finale, the group performed "At Ease" (열중쉬어), co-written and co-composed by iKon's labelmate from YG, Winner's Mino. "At Ease", along with the other participants' songs from the finale, was later included in a special EP titled Kingdom <Finale: Who Is the King?>.

2022-present: Flashback, departure from YG Entertainment 
iKon returned with their fourth EP, Flashback, on May 3, 2022, including the title track "But You". In July, the group held the iKon Japan Tour 2022 in Kobe and Tokyo, where almost all of the shows were sold out. On December 30, 2022, all members of iKON ended their contract with YG Entertainment after 7 years.

On January 1, 2023, all members of iKON signed with 143 Entertainment and announced their plan to release a new album in April. On March 3, 2023, 143 Entertainment announced that iKon would be holding World Tour titled '2023 iKON WORLD TOUR' TAKE OFF in Asia, Europe, and America.

Members
Retrieved from their Naver profile.

Current
 Jay (제이)
 Song (송)
 Bobby (바비)
 DK (디케이)
 Ju-ne (준회)
 Chan (찬)

Former
 B.I (비아이) – leader

Discography

Korean albums
 Welcome Back (2015)
 Return (2018)

Japanese albums
 New Kids (2019)
 Flashback [+ I Decide] (2022)

Tours

Headlining
 iKoncert: Showtime Tour (2016)
 Japan Tour (2016–17) 
 Japan Dome Tour (2017)
 Japan Tour (2018)
 Continue Tour (2018–19)
 iKon Japan Tour 'FLASHBACK' (2022)
 iKon World Tour 'TAKE OFF' (2023)

Joint tours
 YG Family – Power World Tour (as Team B) (2014)

Opening act
 Big Bang – Japan Dome Tour X (2014–15)

Filmography
Heroes of Remix (2016, JSTV)
 iKon Idol School Trip  (2017, JTBC)
 iKon TV (2018, YouTube & JTBC)
 iKon Heart Racing Youth Trip (2018, Olleh TV)
 YG Future Strategy Office (2018, Netflix)
 Kingdom: Legendary War (2021, Mnet)
 Icon of Taste: One Summer Night (2021,Wavve) 
 iKON ON AIR (2022, YouTube)

Awards and nominations

Notes

References

External links

 
K-pop music groups
Musical groups established in 2015
South Korean boy bands
South Korean dance music groups
South Korean hip hop groups
Musical groups from Seoul
2015 establishments in South Korea
MAMA Award winners
Melon Music Award winners
YG Entertainment artists